The  polynomial hyperelastic material model  is a phenomenological model of rubber elasticity.  In this model, the strain energy density function is of the form of a polynomial in the two invariants  of the left Cauchy-Green deformation tensor.

The strain energy density function for the polynomial model is 

For compressible materials, a dependence of volume is added

where

In the limit where , the polynomial model reduces to the Neo-Hookean solid model. For a compressible Mooney-Rivlin material  and we have

References

See also 
 Hyperelastic material
 Strain energy density function
 Mooney-Rivlin solid
 Finite strain theory
 Stress measures

Continuum mechanics
Non-Newtonian fluids
Rubber properties
Solid mechanics